Notidanodon is an extinct genus of cow shark. Fossils ascribed to this genus are known from the Jurassic, Cretaceous, and Paleogene periods. The genus is known from every continent including Antarctica.

Species 
The earliest occurrences of attributed specimens are from the Tithonian of New Zealand, and the latest are from the Thanetian of Europe, Asia, and North America. Currently, four Mesozoic species and two Cenozoic species are attributed to the genus, but the long temporal range and wide range of variation may mean this genus is paraphyletic. Due to this, revisions may be required in the near future.

Mesozoic species 

 N. dentatus
 N. lanceolatus
 N. antarcti

Cenozoic species 

 N. brotzeni
 N. loozi

References 

Prehistoric shark genera
Hexanchidae